A greffier is the clerk to a legislature or a court in some countries where French is, or used to be, the language of the legal system.

The word greffe refers to the records kept by the greffier or the department of government under the greffier's management.

Guernsey 
In Guernsey, HM Greffier is the Clerk of the Royal Court whilst the States' Greffier is the Clerk of the legislative assembly known as the States of Deliberation.

Jersey 
Since 1931, there have been two Greffiers in Jersey.

The Judicial Greffier is the clerk or Registrar of the Royal Court and the other courts of the Island. The Greffier also carries out some of the administrative functions of the Royal Court, for example registering doctors. 

The Greffier of the States is the clerk and record-keeper for the States Assembly. Propositions presented to the States are described as "lodged au Greffe".

France 
The greffiers are responsible for the records of the courts. A judicial document is not valid without a greffier's signature. They also have some responsibilities for evidence.

References 

Guernsey law
Jersey law
French legal terminology